James Bliss (died April 17, 1891) was a state legislator in Alabama. He represented Sumter County, Alabama in the Alabama House of Representatives. He served in 1874.

Masked men went to his home in Hale County, Alabama while he was out and he reportedly fled the area as a result. The account was disputed.

References

Year of birth missing
1891 deaths